The 1984 IIHF Asian Oceanic Junior U18 Championship was the first edition of the IIHF Asian Oceanic Junior U18 Championship. It took place between 23 and 30 March 1984 in Kushiro and Tomakomai, Japan. The tournament was won by Japan, who claimed their first title by finishing first in the standings. China and South Korea finished second and third respectively.

Standings

Fixtures
Reference

References

External links
International Ice Hockey Federation

IIHF Asian Oceanic U18 Championships
Asian
International ice hockey competitions hosted by Japan
1983–84 in Japanese ice hockey